Choctaw Academy was a historic Indian boarding school at Blue Spring in Scott County, Kentucky for Choctaw students. It existed from 1818 to 1842.

History
Baptists started an academy for Choctaws in 1818 near Georgetown, Kentucky, but it quickly failed due to lack of funding. The school was reopened around 1821 after the U.S. acquired Choctaw lands in Mississippi because Chief Peter Pitchlynn and other members of the tribe had worked with U.S. Representative Richard Mentor Johnson to request that part of the treaty money be used on schools. The original Baptist school was located near Johnson's home on his land, so he contacted his brother-in-law William Ward, a U.S. Indian agent, and the school was restarted as a Federal school in 1825, and a three-story stone building was constructed. Johnson's own mixed-race children and other family members attended the school as well as children from various tribes.

Closure and preservation of site
The Indian Removal Act of 1830 caused many Choctaw to move to what is now Oklahoma, and the Choctaw ceased funding the school in 1842 when various reservation schools were founded including Spencer Academy.
 As of 2017 the stone Choctaw Academy building was dilapidatated, and the roof was caving in, but private fundraising was started to save the 1825 building, and a grant was given by  Choctaw Nation of Oklahoma's Chahta Foundation.

Notable alumni and faculty
Julia Chinn, wife/slave of Vice President Johnson, manager of the Choctaw Academy, 
John Tecumseh Jones, interpreter, Baptist minister, businessman, friend of John Brown and founder of Ottawa University in Kansas
Robert Ward Johnson, U.S. Senator from Arkansas, Confederacy supporter
Robert McDonald Jones, Choctaw tribal member, businessman, Confederate politician

References

Native American boarding schools
Schools in Scott County, Kentucky
School buildings completed in 1818
1818 establishments in Kentucky
Choctaw culture
Native American history of Kentucky
1840s disestablishments in Kentucky